Rimebrekka Slope is a crevassed ice slope 4 nautical miles (7 km) south of Rimekalvane Nunataks in the Weyprecht Mountains of Queen Maud Land. Mapped by Norwegian cartographers from surveys and air photos by the Norwegian Antarctic Expedition (1956–60) and named Rimebrekka (the frost slope).
 

Ice slopes of Queen Maud Land
Princess Astrid Coast